THRR or variation, may refer to:

 Training heart rate range (THRR)
 Thrombin receptor (ThrR)

 Thrr, Dog of Thunder (Marvel Comics), an anthropomorphic dog analogue of the Thor character from Earth-8311, as found in the comic book Spider-Ham

See also

 
 Thr (disambiguation)